Qaziabad may refer to:
 Qaziabad, Fars
 Qaziabad, Kerman
 Qaziabad, Andika, Khuzestan Province
 Qaziabad, Ramhormoz, Khuzestan Province
 Qaziabad, Azna, Lorestan Province
 Qaziabad, Dorud, Lorestan Province
 Qaziabad, West Azerbaijan
 Qaziabad, Zanjan